Rahmaniyya Arabic College  is an Islamic Institution based at Katameri in the district of Calicut, Kerala, India. Sayyid Sadiq Ali Shihab Thangal serves as the President and MT Abdullah Musliyar is the Principal.

The Rahmaniyya Arabic college was established at Katameri mosque in the year 1972.

Courses 
Rahmaniyya offers an 8-year course that integrates religious education with general subjects. The government-approved degrees in secular subjects are taught in English and Arabic .

Students and faculty 
There are 330 students and 21 faculty members

References

External links 
 

Islam in Kerala
Institutes of higher Islamic learning in Kerala
Universities and colleges in Kozhikode district
Educational institutions established in 1972
1972 establishments in Kerala